The 2022 Netball Superleague season was the seventeenth season of the Netball Superleague, the elite domestic netball competition in the United Kingdom. Loughborough Lightning were the defending champions, as they won the 2021 season. The season began on 5 February, and ended with the grand final on 5 June.

Manchester Thunder were the first team to qualify for the finals series, after they secured their place on 17 April. Loughborough Lightning qualified for the final series on 2 May. London Pulse qualified for the final series on 14 May. Team Bath were the final team to qualify for the final series, doing so on 21 May. The semi-finals took place on 3 June, with Manchester Thunder and Loughborough Lightning advancing to the grand final. Manchester Thunder beat Loughborough Lightning 60–53 in the final to win the competition, completing an unbeaten season and winning their fourth Superleague title.

Overview

Format
The fixture list for the 2022 Netball Superleague season was announced on 3 November 2021. The season began on 5 February and the grand final is scheduled for 5 June. The first fixtures were the "Season Opener" double-header weekend at the Resorts World Arena in Birmingham on 5 and 6 February, and the Rounds 13 and 14 fixtures were all held at one venue.

In the league section, each team played every other team at home and away in the traditional format. In the 2021 season, all matches had been played at Studio 001 in Wakefield or the Copper Box Arena in London due to the COVID-19 pandemic. Fans are expected to be allowed at all matches; in the 2021 season, matches were held behind closed doors until round 17, and matches from then onwards were limited to 1,000 spectators.

Teams

Source:

Squads
Each team had a squad of 15 players, 12 of whom were registered players, and three training partners. Of the 12 registered players, 10 of them were covered by the sport's salary cap. A team's matchday squad could contain 12 players. Each team were permitted to sign two non-EU players and these players were not allowed to play in the same third of the court simultaneously. The player signing window ran from 15 September to 15 October 2021.

Celtic Dragons signed South African Lefébre Rademan from London Pulse, Annabel Roddy from Loughborough Lightning, as well as Georgia Rowe and Nia Jones from Severn Stars, and both Katarina Short and Louise Marsden, who were unattached players. Leeds Rhinos signed Amy Clinton from Celtic Dragons, Rebekah Airey from Manchester Thunder and Sigi Burger from London Pulse. London Pulse signed Jasmin Odeogberin from Loughborough Lightning, Berri Neil and Alicia Scholes from Manchester Thunder and both Tayla Honey and Sacha McDonald from Australian Suncorp Super Netball side Melbourne Vixens. Loughborough Lightning signed England international player Fran Williams from Wasps, and South African Zanele Vimbela, who missed the 2021 season through injury.

Manchester Thunder signed international players Natalie Haythornthwaite, Shadine van der Merwe and Emma Rayner. Malawian Joyce Mvula resigned for the club on a two-year contract. Saracens Mavericks signed Yasmin Hodge-England from Surrey Storm. Severn Stars signed Cat Tuivaiti from Strathclyde Sirens, Katie Harris from Wasps, Michelle Drayne from London Pulse and Summer Artman from Team Bath. Strathclyde Sirens signed Abby Tyrrell from Celtic Dragons. Surrey Storm signed Ugandan captain Peace Proscovia from Australian club side Sunshine Coast Lightning. Felistus Kwangwa, the first Zimbabwean to play in the Netball Superleague, resigned for Storm. Team Bath signed Lily May Catling from Wasps, and Wasps signed Lauren Nicholls and Lucy Parize from Loughborough Lightning, as well as Ellie Gibbons from Celtic Dragons.

Table

League stage
Source:

Rounds 1 & 2
The match between Leeds Rhinos and Loughborough Lightning was postponed, as Leeds Rhinos did not have 10 available players, due to injuries and COVID-19 cases.

Round 3

Round 4

Round 5

Round 6

Round 7

Round 8

Round 9

Round 10
The matches between Team Bath and Saracens Mavericks and between Strathclyde Sirens and Severn Stars were postponed due to COVID-19 positive tests.

Round 11

Round 12

Round 13

Round 14

Round 15
Manchester Thunder's score of 88 points was a Netball Superleague record for most points in a match.

Round 16

Round 17

Round 18

Round 19

Round 20

Finals series

Semi-finals

Third-place play-off

Grand final

Notes

References

External links
 Official Website

 
2022
2022 in English netball
2022 in Welsh women's sport
2022 in Scottish women's sport
2022 in English women's sport